In Greek mythology, Sandocus (Ancient Greek: Σάνδοκος) was the son of Astynous, the son of Phaethon. He migrated from Syria to Cilicia where he founded a city Celenderis. Sandocus then married Pharnace, daughter of King Megassares of Hyria, and had by her a son, Cinyras. The latter being the father of the famous Adonis by Metharme.

Note

Reference 

 Apollodorus, The Library with an English Translation by Sir James George Frazer, F.B.A., F.R.S. in 2 Volumes, Cambridge, MA, Harvard University Press; London, William Heinemann Ltd. 1921. ISBN 0-674-99135-4. Online version at the Perseus Digital Library. Greek text available from the same website.

Characters in Greek mythology